Jatunñaño Punta or Jatunñano Punta (possibly from Quechua hatun (in Bolivia always jatun) big, ñañu thin (cylindrical objects), slim, punta peak; ridge; first, before, in front of,) is a mountain in the Vilcanota  mountain range in the Andes of Peru, about  high. It is situated in the Cusco Region, Canchis Province, Pitumarca District, and in the Quispicanchi Province, Marcapata District. Jatunñaño Punta lies north of the lake Sibinacocha.

See also 
 Yayamari

References

Mountains of Peru
Mountains of Cusco Region